Bleecker is a Dutch-language occupational surname. Bleecker is an old spelling of (linnen)bleker ("linen bleacher"). Most if not all people listed below are descendants of Jan Jansen Bleecker/Bleeker, who came to New Amsterdam in 1658. In the Netherlands, only the spelling Bleeker is extant as a family name.

People
 Ann Eliza Bleecker (1752–1783), American poet
 Anthony Bleecker (1770–1827), American author and lawyer
 Anthony Lispenard Bleecker (1741–1816), American banker and merchant
 Harmanus Bleecker (1779–1849), US congressman from New York, ambassador to the Netherlands
 Jan Jansen Bleecker (1641/42-1732), Dutch settler in New Netherland, mayor of New York
 Julian Bleecker (born ca. 1967), American mobile artist and technologist 
 Katherine Russell Bleecker (1893-1996), American filmmaker in silent era
 Leon Bleecker (c.1881–1933), New York assemblyman
 Maitland B. Bleecker (1903–2002), American inventor, instrumental in modern helicopter design
Adopted as first name
 A. Bleecker Banks (1835–1910), American book publisher and mayor of Albany

Places
 Bleecker, New York, named after Barent Bleecker, 18th century landowner of the region
 Bleecker Park, Albany, New York
 Bleecker Street, New York City, named after Anthony Lispenard Bleecker
 Bleecker Stadium, Albany, New York, named after  Albany businessman James Edward Bleecker
 Harmanus Bleecker Library, Albany, New York

See also
Bleecker (Bleeker), Alabama

 Bleaker
 Bleecker Street (disambiguation)
 Bleeker (disambiguation)

Dutch-language surnames
Occupational surnames